Jaru may refer to:

Settlements
 Jaru, Alborz, Iran
 Jaru, Khuzestan, Iran
 Jaru, Rondônia, Brazil

Languages
 Jaru or Djaru people, an indigenous Australian people
 Jaru or Djaru language, spoken in Australia by the Djaru people
 Jaru or Urupa language, spoken in Bolivia

Other
 Jaru River, Brazil